Nitro Racers is a video game developed by the Derry-based game studio Torc Interactive and published in Europe by Studio 3DO for the PC. The game was set for release in June 1997, but no contemporary release happened. A demo for the game appeared on Gambler CD #9. In October 2022, the game was released on GOG.com and Steam by Ziggurat interactive.

Gameplay
Nitro Racers is a top-down perspective racing game. The game has three difficulties and three viewing modes. It allows for up to three human players, as well as network play over IPX.

Reception
Next Generation reviewed the game, rating it four stars out of five, and stated: "With its nearly flawless control, multiplayer options, and track editor, Nitro Racers would be one worth picking up – if 3DO releases it over here."

Reviews
PC Zone 53
Computer Games Strategy Plus - Issue 74 January 1997

References

External links 

 DOSBox emulation

Racing video games
Ziggurat Interactive games